Marc Wyatt (born 15 September 1977) is a Welsh international lawn bowler.

Bowls career
In 2011, he won three gold medals at the European Bowls Championships in Portugal.

He competed for Wales in the men's triples at the 2014 Commonwealth Games where he won a bronze medal.

He was selected as part of the Welsh team for the 2018 Commonwealth Games on the Gold Coast in Queensland where he claimed a gold medal in the Pairs with Daniel Salmon.

He has also won the 2002 triples title, 2006 fours title and 2017 pairs title at the Welsh National Bowls Championships when bowling for Caerphilly Town BC and in 2009 he won the triples and fours bronze medals at the Atlantic Bowls Championships.

References

External links

1977 births
Living people
Bowls players at the 2010 Commonwealth Games
Bowls players at the 2014 Commonwealth Games
Bowls players at the 2018 Commonwealth Games
Commonwealth Games gold medallists for Wales
Commonwealth Games bronze medallists for Wales
Welsh male bowls players
Sportspeople from Caerphilly
Commonwealth Games medallists in lawn bowls
Bowls European Champions
Medallists at the 2014 Commonwealth Games
Medallists at the 2018 Commonwealth Games